is the 20th single by Japanese idol duo Wink. Written by Yasushi Akimoto and Kazuhiko Katō, the single was released on February 23, 1994, by Polystar Records.

Background and release 
"Itsumademo Suki de Itakute" was used by Shimadaya for their Teppan Noodles commercial. The B-side, "Ai wo Ubatte Kokoro Shibatte", was used as an image song for NTT Kyushu.

"Itsumademo Suki de Itakute" peaked at No. 19 on the Oricon's weekly charts and sold over 79,000 copies.

Track listing 
All music is arranged by Satoshi Kadokura.

Chart positions 
Weekly charts

Year-end charts

References

External links 
 
 

1994 singles
1994 songs
Wink (duo) songs
Japanese-language songs
Songs with lyrics by Yasushi Akimoto